Jens Fredricson (born 14 December 1967) is a Swedish equestrian. He competed in two events at the 2012 Summer Olympics.

References

External links
 

1967 births
Living people
Swedish male equestrians
Olympic equestrians of Sweden
Equestrians at the 2012 Summer Olympics
Sportspeople from Stockholm